Aitat, or Aytat, is a town located  west of the town of Aley within the district of the same name in the Lebanese governorate of Mount Lebanon.  It was a strategic place during the Lebanese Civil War (1975–1990), due to its view to Beirut.

History
In 1838, Eli Smith noted  the place, called Aithath, located in  El-Ghurb el-Fokany, upper el-Ghurb.

With its neighboring Christian town of Souk El-Gharb, this town remains one of the most memorable places in Lebanon for the Druze and the Christians as a reminder the fierce and deadly battles that occurred during the Lebanese Civil War. Today Aitat and Souk El-Gharb are considered to be the symbol of unity and forgiveness.

The Abi Saab's, Timani’s and Talhouq's, are the most well known families of Aitat and the Aley district.

References

Bibliography

External links
Aaytat,  Localiban

Populated places in Aley District
Druze communities in Lebanon